The following is a list of events, births, and deaths in 1850 in Switzerland.

Incumbents
Federal Council:
Ulrich Ochsenbein 
Jonas Furrer 
Josef Munzinger 
Henri Druey (President)
Friedrich Frey-Herosé
Wilhelm Matthias Naeff 
Stefano Franscini

Events 
 March - The first federal population census in Switzerland takes place
 May 7 - A single currency, the Swiss franc, is imposed to replace cantonal currencies in the first Federal Coinage Act
 October 1 - Der Bund is established
 The Swiss Federal Council asks two British engineers to design plans for a railway network for the Swiss Confederation
 The Swiss Post issues its first postage stamps, the local mail and rayon stamps of Switzerland
 Bieler Tagblatt is established

Births 
 February 23 - César Ritz, hotelier (d. 1918)
 August 9 - Johann Büttikofer, zoologist (d. 1929)

Deaths 
 November 30 - Germain Henri Hess, chemist and doctor (b. 1802)

References 

 
Years of the 19th century in Switzerland